Pittosporum angustifolium (formerly Pittosporum phillyreoides) is a shrub or small tree growing throughout inland Australia. Common names include weeping pittosporum, butterbush, cattle bush, native apricot, apricot tree, gumbi gumbi (or gumby gumby), cumby cumby, meemeei, poison berry bush, and berrigan.

History
Pittosporum angustifolium was first described in 1832 in the Loddiges' The Botanical Cabinet, published by William Loddiges and George Loddiges.

George Bentham combined this species and P. ligustrifolium with P. phillyreoides; however, all three were split in the 2000 revision; the true P. phillyreoides is only found in a narrow coastal strip of northwestern Australia. The weeping foliage of P. angustifolium distinguishes it from the other two taxa.

Description
Pittosporum angustifolium is a slow-growing plant that can reach  in height.

It has pendulous (weeping) branches. The small creamish yellow tubular flowers have a pleasant scent. Flowering occurs from late winter to mid spring. The wrinkled dark red seeds are held within a sticky yellow pulp. Full sun and good drainage is recommended for planting. Seeds germinate in around 17 days without any particular difficulty at 25 °C. There are around 20 viable seeds per gram.
 
Common names include weeping pittosporum, butterbush, cattle bush, native apricot, apricot tree, gumbi gumbi (or gumby gumby), cumby cumby, meemeei, poison berry bush, and berrigan.

Habitat
The species is found in all states of Australia except Tasmania, and in the Northern Territory. It is a widespread plant found across most of inland Australia in mallee communities, alluvial flats, ridges, as well as dry woodland and on loamy, clay or sandy soils, however it is never common.

It is drought- and frost-resistant. A resilient desert species, individuals may live for over a hundred years.

Uses
Cattle often browse on the leaves, which provide reasonable nutrition. The timber can be used for wood turning.

It is also used as an ornamental plant in the garden, prized for its weeping habit and orange fruit.

Aboriginal use
Aboriginal peoples used extracts of the plant in various ways as bush tucker or bush medicine. Uses varied from place to place and people to people.

Some ate or chewed the gum that oozed from branches, while others ground seeds into flour for food. The leaves, seed or wood could be made into an infusion for medicinal uses to relieve internal pain and cramping, or to treat colds, muscle sprains, eczema and other sources of itching.

Western medicine studies

Aboriginal people also used the plant to treat various cancers; however its effects have not been verified by rigorous scientific investigation.

 research into various types of bush medicine is being carried out by Central Queensland University in consultation with Ghungalu elder Uncle Steve Kemp, who has been providing plant materials including gumby gumby parts for the project. The study will include examination of the methods used to extract and process the plants.

References

External links
Pittosporum angustifolium: Occurrence data from the Australasian Virtual Herbarium

Apiales of Australia
Flora of New South Wales
Flora of Victoria (Australia)
Flora of South Australia
Flora of the Northern Territory
Flora of Western Australia
angustifolium
Ornamental trees
Trees of Australia
Drought-tolerant trees
Plants described in 1832